Claude Calame (born in Lausanne 1943) is a Swiss writer on Greek mythology and the structure of mythic narrative from the perspective of a Hellenist trained in semiotics and ethnology (ethnopoetics) as well as philology. He was a professor of Greek language and literature at the University of Lausanne and is now Director of Studies at the School for Advanced Studies in the Social Sciences, in Paris.- He taught also at the Universities of Urbino and Siena in Italy, and at Yale University in the US.

Among his works, several have been translated into English.

Les Chœurs de jeunes filles en Grèce archaïque, 2 vols. (Rome: L'Ateneo and Bizzarri), 1977. Tr. as Choruses of Ancient Women in Greece: their morphology, religious roles and social functions (Lanham, MD: Rowman and Littlefield), 1996, 3d ed.: 2019 (Paris: Les Belles Lettres) In Spartan feminine liturgies Calame detected initiative scenarios in rites of passage interpreted as survivals of archaic "tribal' initiations.
The Craft of Poetic Speech in Ancient Greece (Ithaca NY - London: Cornell University Press), 1995. 
I Greci e l'eros (Rome), 1992; tr. as L'Éros dans la Grèce antique, (Paris: Belin), 1996 and The Poetics of Eros in Ancient Greece (Princeton: Princeton University Press), 1999. 
Thésée et l'imaginaire athénien, (Lausanne:Payot "Sciences humaines"),1991, 3d ed. 2018 (Paris: La Découverte), examines the emergence of a complex new interpretation of archaic traditional materials in the sixth and fifth centuries BCE: "his analysis brings to light how ritual and institutional elaboration accompany the emergence of a national heroic mythology" observed Philippe Borgeaud in an extended review of the revised edition . 
Mythe et histoire dans l'antiquité grecque: la création symbolique d'une colonie (Lausanne: Payot), 1996, 2nd ed.: 2011 (Paris: Les Belles Lettres). Tr. as Myth and history in ancient Greece: the symbolic creation of a colony, 2003
Philippe Borgeaud, Claude Calame and André Hurst, "L’Orphisme et ses écritures. Nouvelles recherches", Revue de l'histoire des religions 4/2002
Masks of Authority: Fiction and Pragmatics in Ancient Greek Poetics, Ithaca NY - London (Cornell University Press, "Myth and Poetics Series"), 2005, collects articles first published between 1986 and 1997.
Greek Mythology. Poetics, Pragmatics and Fiction, Cambridge (Cambridge University Press) 2009
Prométhée généticien. Profits techniques et usages de métaphores, Paris (Les Belles Lettres – « Encre marine ») 2010
Mythe et histoire dans l’Antiquité grecque. La création symbolique d'une colonie, Paris (Les Belles Lettres) 2011 (2e éd.)
Qu’est-ce que la mythologie grecque?, Paris (Gallimard) 2015
Avenir de l’homme et urgence climatique. Au-delà de l’opposition nature/culture, Paris (Lignes) 2015
La tragédie chorale. Poésie grecque et rituel musical, Paris (Les Belles Lettres) 2017

Collections

Rito e poesia corale in Grecia. Guida storica e critica, Roma – Bari (Laterza) 1977, 234 pp.
L'amore in Grecia, Roma – Bari (Laterza) 1983, XL + 310 pp. (quatre éditions) 
Métamorphoses du mythe en Grèce antique, Genève (Labor & Fides) 1988, 231 pp.
Le Discours anthropologique. Description, narration, savoir, Paris (Méridiens Klincksieck) 1990, 306 pp. (2è éd.: Lausanne, Payot, 1995), avec Jean-Michel Adam, Marie-Jeanne Borel et Mondher Kilani
Figures grecques de l'intermédiaire, Lausanne –Paris (Études de Lettres– Belles Lettres) 1992, 146 pp.
Philosophes et historiens anciens face aux mythes, Lausanne – Paris (Études de Lettres – Belles Lettres) 1998, 154 pp., avec David Bouvier
La Fabrication de l'humain dans les cultures et en anthropologie, Lausanne (Payot – Études de Lettres) 1999, 168 pp., avec Mondher Kilani
Figures de l’humain. Les représentations de l’anthropologie, Paris (Éditions de l’EHESS) 2003 360 pp., avec Francis Affergan, Silvana Borutti, Ugo Fabietti, Mondher Kilani, Francesco Remotti (trad. it. : Roma, Meltemi, 2005)
Identités d’auteur dans l’Antiquité et la tradition européenne, Grenoble (Millon) 2004, 198 pp., avec Roger Chartier
Poétique d’Aristophane et langue d’Euripide en dialogue, Lausanne – Paris (Études de Lettres – Belles Lettres) 2004, 142 pp.
Comparer les comparatismes. Perspectives sur l’histoire et les sciences des religions, Paris – Milan (Arche – Edidit) 2005, 242 pp., avec Maya Burger
Identités de l’individu contemporain, Paris (Textuel) 2008, 160 pp.
Le capitalisme contre les individus. Repères altermondialistes, Paris (Textuel – ATTAC) 2010, 142 pp. 
Comparer en histoire des religions antiques. Controverses et propositions, Liège (Presses Universitaires de Liège) 2012, 146 pp., avec Bruce Lincoln
Du récit au rituel par la forme esthétique. Poèmes, images et pragmatique cultuelle en Grèce ancienne, Paris (Les Belles Lettres) 2017, 342 pp., avec Pierre Ellinger
Migrations forcées, discriminations et exclusions. Les enjeux de politiques néocoloniales, Vulaines s/ Seine (Editions du Croquant) 2020, 232 pp.

Notes and references

Anthropologists of religion
Scholars of Greek mythology and religion
Mythographers
Structuralists
Academic staff of the University of Lausanne
Hellenists
Academic staff of the School for Advanced Studies in the Social Sciences
People from Lausanne
Living people
1943 births